is an extreme trans-Neptunian object from the outermost region of the Solar System, approximately  in diameter. With a perihelion distance greater than 40 AU, it is considered a detached object. It is currently  from the Sun and thus moves slowly across the sky.

Orbit and classification 

 orbits the Sun at an average distance of about 266 AU once every 4,347 years. Its orbit has a high eccentricity of 0.83 and an inclination of 8.48° with respect to the ecliptic. As with any slow moving object beyond the orbit of Neptune, an observation arc of several years is required to constrain the orbital parameters.

It is predicted to reach perihelion (closest approach to the Sun) around 2058 coming to opposition in February 2058, while only reaching magnitude 24.3.

Physical characteristics 

See also
 Extreme trans-Neptunian object

References

External links 
 

Minor planet object articles (unnumbered)
20181106